The LKL Most Valuable Player Award is the annual award that is given by the professional Lithuanian Basketball League (LKL), to its Most Valuable Player of each regular season. The MVP is being awarded after regular season, the player is elected by the league.

LKL Season MVPs

Source for the MVPs since the 2009–10 LKL season.

See also
LKL Finals MVP
King Mindaugas Cup
King Mindaugas Cup MVP
LKF Cup

References list

External links 
 Official LKL website
 Official LKL YouTube.com channel
 Lithuanian league at Eurobasket.com

Lietuvos krepšinio lyga lists
MVP